Gumboro Hundred is a hundred in Sussex County, Delaware, United States. Gumboro Hundred was formed in 1873 from Dagsboro Hundred.

References

Hundreds in Sussex County, Delaware